Brachmia brunnea is a moth in the family Gelechiidae. It was described by John David Bradley in 1961. It is found on Guadalcanal.

The wingspan is 8–9 mm. The forewings are cream buff, irrorated (sprinkled) with dark fuscous. The stigmata is cloudy and obscure, with the plical slightly basad of the first discal and the second discal at the end of the cell in the middle. The costa is suffused with fuscous at the base and otherwise narrowly edged with cream buff to the apex. The hindwings are pale grey.

References

Moths described in 1961
Brachmia
Moths of Oceania